Horn Concerto No. 1 may refer to:

 Horn Concerto No. 1 (Haydn)
 Horn Concerto No. 1 (Mozart)
 Horn Concerto No. 1 (Strauss)